Dichagyris polycala is a species of cutworm or dart moth in the family Noctuidae. It is found in North America.

The MONA or Hodges number for Dichagyris polycala is 10875.

References

Further reading

 
 
 

polycala
Articles created by Qbugbot
Moths described in 2004
Moths of North America